The following is a list of royal or noble centenarians. For more lists, see lists of centenarians.

Footnotes

External links 
 

Royalty and nobility